Asansol Airfield  is a former wartime Royal Air Force Station and later used by the United States Army Air Forces airfield in Asansol, India used during the Burma Campaign 1944-1945. It is located near Nigah village on NH 2/ Grand Trunk Road.

History
Established in 1941 by the Royal Air Force as a result of the Japanese conquest of Burma.   On 3 April 1942 six USAAF 7th Bombardment Group B-17 Flying Fortress aircraft took off from Asansol Airfield to bomb warehouses and docks at Rangoon.

On 6–7 April, 10 DC-3s of Pan American Airways begin hauling 30,000 gallons of fuel and 500 gallons of lubricants from Dum Dum Airport, Calcutta to Asansol for operations. This fuel, subsequently transferred via Dinjan Airfield, India to China, was for use by Lieutenant Colonel James H Doolittle's raiders when they landed in Chuchow, about 100 miles southwest of Shanghai, China after their attack on Japan.    Doolittle Raiders never made Chuchow due to fuel shortages, aircraft subsequently lost.

In 1943, airfield turned over to USAAF.  Initially used by 5318th Provisional Air Unit, beginning late 1943 operating P-51 Mustangs, B-25 Mitchell medium bombers and C-47 transports with Waco CG-4A gliders used for attacks in Burma.  The unit tested the United States' first use of a helicopter in combat, six Sikorsky R-4s in May 1944.    1st Air Commando Group activated in May 1944.  Used by 164th, 165th, 166th Liaison Squadrons, equipped with UC-64, L-5 observation aircraft, September–December 1944.  Later used by 5th and 6th Fighter Squadrons, December 1944-June 1945 flying P-47 Thunderbolts.

Also used by 319th Troop Carrier Squadron, flying C-47s, September–December 1944.  1st ACG returned to United States, 6 October 1945.

References

 Maurer, Maurer. Air Force Combat Units of World War II. Maxwell Air Force Base, Alabama: Office of Air Force History, 1983. 
 www.pacificwrecks.com - Asansol Airfield

External links
Airports Authority of India

Airfields of the United States Army Air Forces in British India
Royal Air Force stations of World War II in Asia
Defunct airports in India
Airports in West Bengal
Buildings and structures in Paschim Bardhaman district
Transport in Asansol
Airports established in 1941
World War II sites in India
1941 establishments in India
20th-century architecture in India